Road Trips Volume 3 Number 1 is a two-CD live album by the American rock band the Grateful Dead.  The ninth in their "Road Trips" series of albums, it was recorded on December 28, 1979, at the Oakland Auditorium in Oakland, California, and contains the complete show from that date.  A third, bonus disc included with some copies of the album was recorded two nights later, December 30, 1979, at the same venue.   The album was released on November 10, 2009.

Another Grateful Dead album that was recorded at the December 1979 run of concerts at the Oakland Auditorium is Dick's Picks Volume 5.

Track listing

Disc One
First set:

Second set:

Disc Two

Encore:

Bonus Disc
December 30, 1979:
"New Minglewood Blues" (Noah Lewis) – 8:21
"Candyman" (Garcia, Hunter) – 6:56
"Ramble On Rose" (Garcia, Hunter) – 7:44
"Lazy Lightning" > (Weir, Barlow) – 3:27
"Supplication" (Weir, Barlow) – 5:54
"Scarlet Begonias" > (Garcia, Hunter) – 10:24
"Fire on the Mountain" > (Hart, Hunter) – 9:23
"Let It Grow" (Weir, Barlow) – 10:10
"Truckin'" > (Garcia, Phil Lesh, Weir, Hunter) – 7:21
"Wharf Rat" (Garcia, Hunter) – 9:11

Personnel

Grateful Dead
 Jerry Garcia – lead guitar, vocals
 Mickey Hart – drums
 Bill Kreutzmann – drums
 Phil Lesh – electric bass, vocals
 Brent Mydland – keyboards, vocals
 Bob Weir – rhythm guitar, vocals

Production
Produced by Grateful Dead
Photos by Jay Blakesberg
Booklet essay by Steve Silberman

December 30, 1979 set list
The set list for the December 30, 1979 concert at the Oakland Auditorium Arena was:
First set: "New Minglewood Blues"*, "Candyman"*, "Me and My Uncle" > "Big River", "Ramble On Rose"*, "Lazy Lightnin'"* > "Supplication"*, "Deal"
Second set: "Scarlet Begonias"* > "Fire on the Mountain"*, "Let It Grow"* > "Drums" > "Space" >  "Truckin'"* > "Wharf Rat"* > "Around & Around" >  "Johnny B. Goode"
Encore: "Don't Ease Me In", "Brokedown Palace"
* Included in the Road Trips Volume 3 Number 1 bonus disc

Notes

Road Trips albums
2009 live albums
Grateful Dead Records live albums